The following is an incomplete list of training centres, research and development sites, administrative sites and other establishments used by the Special Operations Executive during the Second World War.

Numbered stations
Establishments concerned with experimental work, storage and production were given Roman numerals (mostly in Hertfordshire). Active stations and training schools had Arabic numbers. These included paramilitary schools around Arisaig in Scotland, "finishing" schools around Beaulieu in Hampshire and operational schools in various counties including Gloucestershire, Leicestershire, Oxfordshire.

Active stations
These were SOE's radio stations, established when SOE's signals establishments were separated from that of SIS / GCCS at Bletchley Park (originally "Station X"). This formally took place on 1 June 1942.

Station 53a - Grendon Hall in Grendon Underwood, near Aylesbury, Buckinghamshire - signals centre.  Now Spring Hill Prison.
Station 53b - Poundon House, Buckinghamshire, near Bicester - radio listening and transmission station.

Experimental stations
Experimental stations were mainly based in and around Hertfordshire, and included:
Station VI - Bride Hall near Ayot St Lawrence, Hertfordshire - the weapons acquisition section.
Station VIIa - Bontex Knitting Mills, Beresford Avenue, Wembley - Wireless Section Production
Station VIIb - Yeast-Vite factory, Whippendell Road, Watford - Wireless Section, packing and dispatch
Station VIIc - Allensor's joinery factory, King George's Avenue, Watford - Wireless Section Research
Section VIId - Kay's garage, Bristol Street, Birmingham - Wireless Section Production
Station VIII - Engineering section, Queen Mary Reservoir, Staines
Station IX - The Frythe estate near Welwyn Garden City, which began as a wireless research unit (Special Signals), then became a weapons development & production centre, then a research and development station.  Now a factory belonging to GlaxoSmithKline
Station IXa - P O Box 1, Ashford, Middlesex - Submersibles work at Staines reservoir.
Station IXc - Fishguard Bay Hotel,  Goodwick, Pembrokeshire - Submersibles work in Fishguard Bay.
 (Station X - the original name for Bletchley Park in Buckinghamshire that continued to be used as a nickname for BP after it went on to greater things.)
Station XI - Old Gorhambury House near St Albans, Hertfordshire - Accommodation.
Station XII - Aston House near Stevenage, Hertfordshire - Research and Development of sabotage explosives and weapons, etc. 
Station XIV - Briggens House, near Roydon, Essex, contained the Forgery Section.
Station XV - The Thatched Barn - road house on the Barnet bypass at Borehamwood, Hertfordshire - Camouflage Section. Much of the work of this station involved the final equipping of agents who came through the Thatched Barn prior to going to France. Typical of the work was reproducing French clothing which was copied from newspaper photographs, catalogues etc. and had to be perfect down to the last stitch and button. Maps were hand sewn into silk underwear, agents were made up with false humped backs etc. to enhance their disguise. Strict anonymity was observed. The station was also concerned with the development of booby traps including very original devices such as bicycle pumps which were swapped and exploded when used. Other work included packing hand grenades into tins labelled as fruit. The labels were reproduced by skilled artists to look like the real thing. Plaster of Paris was moulded and painted to resemble a log and inside was a Sten gun.
Station XVa - 56 Queen's Gate, Kensington, London SW7 - Camouflage Section - prototypes.
Station XVb -  The Demonstration Room, Natural History Museum in London. Camouflage Section - A training centre for agents and for briefing officials.
Station XVc - 2-3 Trevor Square, Knightsbridge, South Kensington - Camouflage Section, photographic and make-up section.
Station XVII - Brickendonbury, Brickendon, Hertford - Explosive trials

Training schools
STS 1 - Brock Hall, Flore, Northamptonshire
STS 2 - Bellasis, Box Hill Road, Dorking, Surrey - training of SOE staff and Danes, Italians. Became training and holding centre used by Czech Section and for F Section coup de main parties. Later used for initial assessment of German Army PoWs as BONZO agents.
STS 3 - Stodham Park, Liss, Hampshire - Norwegian depot school, staff training courses, British and OSS Jedburghs initial assessment centre,  specialised course in mines and the use of enemy weapons, training of German and Russian (German Army) former POWs.
STS 4 - Winterfold, Cranleigh, Surrey - Preliminary School for N (Dutch) and T (Belgian) Sections. From June 1943 became STS 7, Students' Assessment Board (SAB).
STS 5 - Wanborough Manor, Puttenham, Guildford, Surrey - initially the Preliminary School for F (French) Section, later (from June 1943) holding depot for Dutch agents and training of German Army PoWs as BONZOs.
STS 6 - West Court, Finchampstead, Wokingham, Berkshire
STS 7 (formerly STS 4) - Winterfold, Cranleigh, Surrey - Students' Assessment Board for several nationalities/sections.
STS 17 - Brickendonbury Manor - sabotage
Station 17 (originally XVII) Brickendonbury Manor, Brickendon, Hertford, Hertfordshire
STS 19 - Gardener's End, Ardeley, Stevenage, Hertfordshire - Bonzos for Operation Periwig
Station 19 - Gardener's End, Ardeley, Stevenage, Hertfordshire
STS 20a & 20b - Pollards Park House, Chalfont St Giles - Polish section
STS 21 - Arisaig House, Arisaig, Inverness-shire - commando-style training 
STS 22 - Rhubana Lodge, Morar, Inverness-shire
STS 22a - Glasnacardoch Lodge, Mallaig, Inverness-shire - weapons store where weapons were serviced and checked for accuracy.
STS 23 - Meoble Lodge, beside Loch Morar, Inverness-shire
STS 23b - Swordland, Tarbet Bay, beside Loch Morar, Inverness-shire
STS 24a - Inverie House, Knoydart, near Mallaig, Inverness-shire
STS 24b - Glaschoille, Knoydart, Mallaig, Inverness-shire
STS 25a - Garramor, South Morar, Inverness-shire
STS 25b - Camusdarach, South Morar, Inverness-shire
STS 25c - Traigh House, South Morar, Inverness-shire
STS 26 - Drumintoul Lodge, Aviemore, Inverness-shire and Glenmore Lodge, Inverness-shire - Norwegian Holding School / Main Headquarters of Linge Company
Station XXVIII (28) - Tyting House, St Martha's Hill, Guildford. Holding/security establishment, also housed Field Security Section.
STS 31 to STS 36 - Beaulieu, Hampshire - Finishing Schools
STS 31 - The Rings, Beaulieu, Hampshire - security training for agents
STS 31 - The House in the Woods, Beaulieu, Hampshire
STS 32 - Harford House, Beaulieu, Hampshire 
STS 32a - Saltmarsh, Beaulieu, Hampshire 
STS 32b - Blackbridge, Beaulieu, Hampshire 
STS 35 - Vineyards, Beaulieu, Hampshire - radio and telegraphy mostly french
STS 36 - Boarmans, Beaulieu, Hampshire - female only
STS 37a - ??? - advanced photography
STS 38 - Briggens House, near Roydon, Esssex - Polish Section. 
STS 39 - (Hackett School), ??? - subversive propaganda
STS 40 - Howbury Hall, near Waterend, Bedford - training in use of EUREKA, REBECCA and S-Phone.  Reception Committee School.
STS 41 - Gumley Hal, Market Harborough
STS 42 - Roughwood Park, Chalfont St Giles, Bucks
STS 43 - Audley End House, Essex - Polish section
STS 44 - Water Eaton Manor near Oxford
STS 45 - Hatherop Castle, Fairford, Gloucestershire - Danish Holding School / Headquarters 
STS 46 - Chichely Hall, Buckinghamshire - Czechoslovak Section
STS 47 - ??? - advanced training on mines
STS 49 -Forthampton House, Tewkesbury, Gloucestershire
STS 50 - Gorse Hill, Witley near Godalming in Surrey
STS 51 - Dunham House, Altrincham, Cheshire - parachute training (near RAF Ringway)
STS 51b - Fulshaw Hall, Wilmslow, Cheshire - parachute training (near RAF Ringway)
STS 52 - Thame Park, Oxfordshire - security training for wireless operators
Station 53c - Poundon, Buckinghamshire, near Bicester. - Training American forces in SOE communications techniques. Station 53b and Station 53c were physically separate establishments but close to each other. Some of the staff from Station 53b were transferred when Station 53c opened.
STS 54a - Fawley Court, Henley on Thames - Signals Section (Wireless Operators)
STS 54b - Belhaven School, Dunbar - Signals Section (Wireless Operators)
STS 61 - Audley End, Saffron Walden - packing parachute containers
STS 61 - Gaynes' Hall, St Neots (after April 1942)
STS 62, later Station 62 - Anderson Manor, Anderson, Dorset
STS 63 Warnham Court, Warnham, Horsham, West Sussex. Used by EU/P (Polish Minorities) Section, including for (aborted) Operation Bardsea and Operation Dunstable.
STS 101 - Tanjong Baili, Singapore.
STS 102 (also ME 102 and STC 102) - Mount Carmel, above Haifa in Mandate Palestine, now Israel. With parachute training at RAF Ramat David, weapons training at Athlit (now Atlit), paramilitary training at Megiddo and (Palmach training) at Mishmar HaEmek.
STS 103 - Camp X - Whitby, Ontario, Canada - used to train Canadian and American agents

Other sites
Other stations, whose code numbers are unknown, included:
Gaynes Hall near St Neots in Cambridgeshire - Norwegian section.
The Firs, Whitchurch - a large house in Whitchurch, Buckinghamshire, home of the semi-independent section MD1
Henley-on-Thames - quartermaster
Norgeby House, 83 Baker Street, London - headquarters of European country sections
No 6 Special Workshop School, Inverlair, Inverness-shire. Known colloquially as "The Cooler" and possibly ISRB Workshops, agents who had either failed their training or been recalled from operations were sent here.
Pictures of many of the sites in the southeast of England
Messrs Carpet Trades Ltd of Kidderminster packed about 18,500 containers after November 1943.
Erlestoke Park (near Devizes) - Another stately home used for the 'Senior Officers School'.
Station unknown - Spartan factory, North Circular Road, Wembley, London - Unknown

References

Further reading

External links
Google map locations of sites

Special Operations Executive
Ministry of Economic Warfare
World War II sites in the United Kingdom
World War II sites of the United Kingdom
World War II sites in England
Locations in the history of espionage